The Victory Sun (Turkish: Zafer Güneşi) is a 1953 Turkish drama film directed by and starring Seyfi Havaeri.

Cast
 Seyfi Havaeri 
 Fatma Andaç 
 Atıf Kaptan 
 Hüseyin Kaşif 
 Lebibe Çakin
 Nuri Akinci 
 Ziya Aygen 
 Nalan Küçük 
 Hikmet Serçe 
 Leman Tekmen
 Rıza Tüzün 
 Necabettin Yal 
 Faruk Yüce

References

Bibliography
 Burçak Evren. Türk sinema sanatçıları ansiklopedisi. Film-San Vakfı Yayınları, 1983.

External links
 

1953 films
1953 drama films
1950s Turkish-language films
Turkish drama films
Films directed by Seyfi Havaeri
Turkish black-and-white films